Aşağı Nemətabad (also, Aşağı Ne’mətabad, Ashaga Neymetabad, Ashagy Neymetabad, Ashagy-Neymatabad, and Ermeni Neymetabad) is a village and a municipality in the Agdash Rayon of Azerbaijan. It has a population of 948. The municipality consists of the villages of Aşağı Nemətabad and Yenikənd.

References 

Populated places in Agdash District